Aqbalyq is a village in Almaty Region of south-eastern Kazakhstan. The population of Aqbalyq is around 90.

References

External links
Tageo.com

Populated places in Almaty Region